Chris Horrocks (born November 15, 1954) is a former Canadian international and North American Soccer League defender.

Horrocks played in Canada's back for 18 times between 1972 and 1977, including starting all 8 internationals Canada played in 1973 through 1975. He was on the Canadian team at the 1975 Pan American Games. 
He played in the NASL for the Montreal Olympique in 1972 and 1973, the Toronto Metros-Croatia in 1976 when they won the Soccer Bowl, and the Las Vegas Quicksilvers in 1977. In 1974, he played in the National Soccer League with Quebec Selects. In 1978, he returned to play in the NSL with Montreal Castors.

References

External links
NASL stats
Canadian Soccer Association website
The Development of Youth Soccer in Canada

1954 births
Living people
Association football defenders
Canadian expatriate sportspeople in the United States
Canadian expatriate soccer players
Canadian National Soccer League players
Canada men's international soccer players
Canadian soccer players
Expatriate soccer players in the United States
Las Vegas Quicksilver players
Montreal Castors players
Montreal Olympique players
North American Soccer League (1968–1984) players
Toronto Blizzard (1971–1984) players
Anglophone Quebec people
Soccer players from Montreal
Pan American Games competitors for Canada
Footballers at the 1975 Pan American Games